Luke is a village in Nõo Parish, Tartu County, Estonia.

The Luke Manor is located in the village.

References

 

Villages in Tartu County
Kreis Dorpat